Albert James Allen (25 November 1912 – 21 January 1972) was an Australian rules footballer who played with Geelong in the Victorian Football League (VFL).

Notes

External links 

1912 births
1972 deaths
Australian rules footballers from Victoria (Australia)
Geelong Football Club players